Bernard Francis Cowen (29 January 1932 – 24 January 1984) was an Irish Fianna Fáil politician who served as a Minister of State from March 1982 to December 1982. He served as a Teachta Dála (TD) for the Laois–Offaly constituency from 1969 to 1973 and 1977 to 1984. He was a Senator for the Agricultural Panel from 1973 to 1977.

Early life
Born in Clara, County Offaly, the son of Christy Cowen, a cattle dealer and a Fianna Fáil member who served as a member of Offaly County Council from 1932 until his death in 1967. Cowen was educated at Clara National School and subsequently attended Tullamore CBS. After completion of his secondary schooling he worked in the family business which included a public house and a butcher shop. He later became an auctioneer.

Political career
Cowen first became involved in politics in 1967, when he was co-opted onto Offaly County Council, following the death of his father. Later that year he headed the poll in the Tullamore area and retained his seat until his death.

Cowen was first elected to Dáil Éireann as a Fianna Fáil TD for Laois–Offaly constituency at the 1969 general election. Fianna Fáil returned to government for the fourth successive time following a general election, however, as a new TD, Cowen remained on the backbenches. He lost his seat at the 1973 general election as a Fine Gael-Labour coalition government was formed. Cowen, however, was subsequently elected to the 13th Seanad for the Agricultural Panel.

Cowen returned to the Dáil following the 1977 general election, when Fianna Fáil returned to power in a landslide. Once again he remained on the backbenches.

In 1979, Jack Lynch resigned as Taoiseach and Leader of Fianna Fáil. Cowen supported the bid of Charles Haughey for the leadership. Haughey won the subsequent leadership election. Although he had supported Haughey, Cowen failed to secure promotion to ministerial office.

A period of political instability followed with three general elections being held throughout 1981 and 1982. Cowen retained his seat in all of these elections. In March 1982, he was finally promoted to junior ministerial level, when he was appointed Minister of State at the Department of Agriculture with special responsibility for disadvantaged areas. He held that position until December of the same year, when Fianna Fáil lost office.

Death
While attending a meeting of Offaly County Council in January 1984, Cowen was taken ill. He was taken to St. Vincent's Hospital in Dublin. He died several days later on 24 January 1984. He was survived by his wife, Mary, and three sons. The consequent by-election for his seat in the 24th Dáil was won by his second son, Brian, who later served as Taoiseach from 2008 to 2011. In 2011, Bernard Cowen's youngest son, Barry, was elected to the seat previously held by his father and brother, having previously been an Offaly County Councillor for the Tullamore local electoral area.

References

 

 

 

1932 births
1984 deaths
Bernard
Fathers of Taoisigh
Fianna Fáil TDs
Local councillors in County Offaly
Members of the 13th Seanad
Members of the 19th Dáil
Members of the 21st Dáil
Members of the 22nd Dáil
Members of the 23rd Dáil
Members of the 24th Dáil
Ministers of State of the 23rd Dáil
Politicians from County Offaly
People from Tullamore, County Offaly
Fianna Fáil senators